Kawana Station is the name of two train stations in Japan:

 Kawana Station (Shizuoka) (川奈駅) in Shizuoka Prefecture
 Kawana Station (Nagoya) (川名駅) in Nagoya, Aichi Prefecture